Frederick Settle Barff (6 October 1822 – 11 August 1886) was an English chemist, ecclesiastical decorator, and stained glass manufacturer, much interested in theology.

He is best known as a chemist, having invented several important preservation methods for a range of materials, including iron, stone, wood and foodstuffs. Several of his stained glass windows still survive throughout Ireland and the north of England.

A portrait photograph of Barff appears in The History of St Stanislaus College, Beaumont, published in 1911.

Early life 
Born in Hackney, London, the son of a doctor, Barff was educated at Christ's College, Cambridge, where he earned a BA in 1844, followed by an MA in 1847. After graduating, he was ordained at Peterborough and started work as an Anglican curate in Hull. He also served as curate of St Nicholas' Church, Leicester, before, in 1852, converting to Catholicism.

Ecclesiastical decorator 

By the mid-1850s, Barff established Mssrs. F.S. Barff & Co., an ecclesiastical decorating company, in Liverpool.

North England 
He supervised the interior decoration of St Patrick's Church, Liverpool and painted the frescoes at Stonyhurst College. The firm also decorated the churches of St Wilfrid's, Preston and St Mary's, Chelsea.<ref group=notes>The Tablet, 13 October 1854(or 1855), 647 quoted in Irish Architectural Archive</ref>

 Ireland 
By 1858 Barff's company had moved to Dublin, possibly influenced by his contemporary and fellow convert John Hungerford Pollen, where most of the work was undertaken for Catholic churches.

Works executed in Ireland:

During this period, Barff gave a lecture on Decorative Art to the Dublin Mechanics Institute and successfully patented several processes associated with his work, one of which won honourable mention during the 1862 International Exhibition.

 Patents 

The company continued to operate until 1864, when it went bankrupt, at which time Barff returned to England.

 Chemist 

 Teaching 
On his return, Barff became a teacher at Beaumont College, a Jesuit school in Windsor, before moving to University College, London as assistant professor of chemistry. He later became professor of chemistry at the Royal Academy of Arts for eight years and also at the Catholic University College, Kensington, a position for which he was nominated by Cardinal Manning, as well as at the Beaumont College.

He was made a Fellow of the Chemical Society in 1867.

Barff acted as Examiner in Chemistry for the Natural science tripos at Cambridge University, a role he was first awarded in 1873.

 Society of Arts lectures 
Barff delivered three series of Cantor Lectures to the Society of Arts: in 1870, on artistic colours and pigments; in 1872, on the treatment of carbon compounds for heating and lighting purposes; and a further series on  Silicates, Silicides, Glass, and Glass Painting.

He also delivered the juvenile lectures, for 1878, on the subject of Coal and its Compounds.

Barff was awarded two Art Society's medals: one for a paper on Zinc White as Paint, and the Treatment of Iron for the Prevention of Corrosion and the other for his paper on A New Antiseptic Compound, the latter of which he presented to the society in March 1882.

 Published works 
 An Introduction to scientific chemistry, 1869.
 An introduction to scientific chemistry: designed for the use of schools, 1869
 Elementary chemistry, 1875.

 Society of Arts publications 
 On silicates, silicides, glass and glass painting, 1872
 Carbon & certain compounds of carbon, treated principally in reference to heating and illuminating purposes 1874
 The treatment of iron for the prevention of corrosion, 1877

 Design and inventions 

Barff is most widely remembered for his invention of a method of rust proofing cast iron, named after him. The method used superheated steamPopular Science Jul 1886 Vol. 29, No. 19, p.393. Bonnier Corporation. ISSN 0161-7370. Retrieved June 2011 to form a layer of tri-iron tetroxide(Fe3O4), which proved much cheaper than traditional galvanisation. The method was subsequently improved by George Bower, after which the process became known as the Bower–Barff process. The Bower-Barff Rustless Iron Co. had works in Southwark and New York, the latter supplying cast-iron for many of the city's landmark buildings.

He also created an antiseptic compound, Boro glycerine,Fallows, Samuel (1835)  The progressive dictionary of the English language: a supplementary wordbook to all leading dictionaries of the United States and Great Britain p.85. Progressive Pub. Co. Retrieved June 2011 primarily for the preservation of meats but which subsequently found many medical uses. It is still used in some parts of the world as an oral antiseptic in the treatment of mouth ulcers.Prasad, B. (1997) Principles and Practice of Medicine a Textbook for Students and Practitioners  p.343. Jaypee Brothers Publishers  Retrieved June 2011 A caricature of Barff, contemplating a barrel of boro glycerine, appeared in an 1882 edition of Punch as No.84 of the Fancy Portraits series.

Barff was an early exponent of the use of hydrocarbons as fuel, starting Sim & Barff's Patent Mineral Oil Steam Fuel Company, for the purpose of developing heating, power and lighting systems which could operate on liquid hydrocarbons. At a time when experiments in the field appeared to show little promise of success, Barff believed that ...these oils are doubtless destined to form the marine steam fuel of the future.

Barff's design experiments to remove noxious elements from the exhaust products of combustion in locomotives and similar furnaces'', a precursor to the catalytic converter, were met with some ridicule as the weight of reagents needed were almost equal to the weight of fuel burned.

Patents

Death 
Barff died of complications associated with diabetes at Buckingham, and was buried with his wife Margaretta in Kensal Green Cemetery.

Notes

References 

1822 births
1866 deaths
Alumni of Christ's College, Cambridge
Burials at Kensal Green Cemetery
English Roman Catholics
English Christians
English inventors
19th-century British chemists
Writers from London
Converts to Roman Catholicism from Anglicanism
Converts to Roman Catholicism